VELAVALI is a beautiful village in the Kadapa district of Andhra Pradesh, India. It is located near Proddatur, a town known for its gold and cotton business. And in 1960 was stated ZPPH School for surrounding villages. 

Velavali is situated on the banks of the river Kundu on one side and other 3 sides are surrounded by agricultural fields. The main resource for Velavali is agriculture, and the main water resource is the Kundu river and K.C Canal.

The population of the village is approximately 3,200. It is a major panchayat in the Rajupalem mandal...000

References

Villages in Kadapa district